Lenira Santos (born 21 April 1987) is a Cape Verdean sprinter.

Santos was due to compete in the Women's 200 metres at the 2008 Summer Olympics but later pulled out due to injury.

Santos also competed in the 200 and 400 metre events at the 2006 Lusophony Games in Macau.

References

1987 births
Living people
Cape Verdean female sprinters